Sedeh (also known as Seh Deh) is a village in Miyan Deh Rural District, Shibkaveh, Fasa County, Fars Province, Iran. At the 2006 census, its population was 166, in 38 families.

References 

Populated places in Fasa County